The sixth season of Dance Moms, an American dance reality television created by Collins Avenue Productions, began airing on January 5, 2016 on Lifetime's television network. The season concluded on November 22, 2016. A total of 33 official episodes and one special episode (No Moms Allowed) aired this season.

Episodes

References

General references 
 

2016 American television seasons